The Center for Early Education is a private primary school located in West Hollywood, Los Angeles County, California.

History
The Center for Early Education was founded in 1939 by a group of professional psychoanalysts who were interested in respecting the inner world of children. Since then the School has become regarded as one of the top elementary schools in the nation. It has been noted for a high "feeder" rate into Harvard-Westlake School.

Demographics 
More than 50% of the student body during the 2016-17 school years was non-white. According to Town & Country magazine, "The school looks for diversity, in the hopes of a student body that represents the full spectrum of LA's varied population."

Facilities
The current campus consists of three major buildings, with classrooms, a library, a community center, a gym, an innovation center and additional indoor and outdoor instructional space. The school is currently undergoing a major campus renovation that will include more classrooms and sports facilities. The expansion is scheduled to be completed in early 2020.

2021 data breach 
In February 2021 The Hollywood Reporter reported that hackers leaked confidential staff salaries and parent contact information of the school in emails with racist, sexist and homophobic language.

Alumni
 Jake Gyllenhaal
 Maggie Gyllenhaal
 Jonah Hill

Parents of alumni
 Beyoncé and Jay-Z
 Jamie Lee Curtis and Christopher Guest
 Michael Eisner
 Jodie Foster
 Peter Frampton
 Cher
 Neil Diamond
 Amy Heckerling
 Bob Iger
 Lawrence Kasdan
 Alan Ladd Jr.
 Leslie Moonves
 Jack Nicholson
 Bruce Springsteen
 Barbra Streisand
 Denzel Washington
 Val Kilmer

References

Private elementary schools in California
West Hollywood, California
Educational institutions established in 1939
1939 establishments in California